Wifaq ul Madaris Al-Arabia, Pakistan is the largest federation of Islamic seminaries in Pakistan, founded in 1959. More than 10,000 seminaries and 23,000 madaris across Pakistan are affiliated with the federation. It controls all the seminaries which are run by Deobandi School of thought.
 
Mufti Taqi Usmani has been appointed as the new president on 19 September 2021 after the death of the former president, Abdur Razzaq Iskander. 

Qari Muhammad Hanif Jalandhari is general sectary of the federation. The head office of the federation is situated in Multan.

Functions
The functions of 'Wifaq ul Madaris Al-Arabia, Pakistan' are the registration of seminaries, creation of syllabus, checking standard of education, arrangement of examination and issuance of degrees.

Presidents
 Shamsul Haq Afghani (19 October 1959 – 12 January 1963)
 Khair Muhammad Jalandhari (12 January 1963 – 22 October 1970) – founder of Jamia Khair-ul-Madaris Multan.
 Sayyed Yousuf Banuri (30 May 1973 – 17 October 1977) – founder of  Jamia Uloom-ul-Islamia.
 Mufti Mahmud (15 May 1978 – 14 October 1980)
 Muhammad Idrees Meerthi (30 November 1980 – 1988)
 Maulana Saleemullah Khan (8 June 1989 – 15 January 2017) - founder of Jamia Farooqia Karachi.
 Abdur Razzaq Iskander (5 October 2017 – 30 June 2021) – Chancellor of Jamia Uloom-ul-Islamia.
Muhammad Taqi Usmani (19 September 2021 – present)

See also 
 List of Deobandi organisations
Ittehad-e-Tanzeemat-Madaris Pakistan
Madrassas in Pakistan
Qawmi, Bangladesh

References

External links
Wifaq-ul-Madaris Official Website 
Wifaq ul Madaris results
wifaq-ul-madaris-admission

Islamic political organizations
Islamic schools in Pakistan
Deobandi Islamic universities and colleges
Madrasas in Pakistan
Wifaq ul Madaris Al-Arabia, Pakistan
Education in Pakistan
1959 establishments in Pakistan
Deobandi organisations